The Toronto Dingos is an amateur Australian rules football club based in Toronto, Ontario, Canada competing in the AFL Ontario. The team was formed in February 1996.

OAFL Premierships
2000
2003
2004
2005

See also

External links

Australian rules football clubs in Toronto
1996 establishments in Ontario
Australian rules football clubs established in 1996